Lorelei is a fictional character appearing in American comic books published by Marvel Comics. She is based on the being Lorelei from Germanic mythology.

Lorelei appeared in the first season of the Marvel Cinematic Universe television series Agents of S.H.I.E.L.D. and she was played by Elena Satine.

Publication history
Lorelei first appeared in Thor #337 (November 1983), and was created by Walt Simonson.

She made subsequent appearances in Thor #338-350 (December 1983-December 1984), Thor #354-355 (April–May 1985), #357-359 (July–September 1985), #363 (January 1986), #367-368 (May–June 1986), The Official Handbook of the Marvel Universe vol 2. #7 (June 1986), Thor #383 (September 1987), #398-400 (December 1988-February 1989), #402 (April 1989), Black Knight vol. 2 #3 (August 1990), Thor #438 (November 1991), #440 (December 1991), #476 (July 1994), #485 (April 1995), Journey into Mystery #509-511 (May–August 1997), The Defenders vol. 2 #1-4 (March–June 2001), Loki #1 (January 2004), and Thor: Son of Asgard #5 (June 9, 2004).

Fictional character biography
In Asgard, a bored Loki sees warriors engaged in a forbidden Troll hunt. Lorelei, a beautiful woman, offers to help the troll by hiding it. When she gets close, however, she hoists it in the air, winning the hunt through trickery and impressing the men. Loki invites Lorelei to his castle and, despite Helgi's warnings, she goes with him. The pair trick Sif into leaving; then Loki turns into Thor and the two kiss. When Sif finds them, she is furious; she  strikes them both to the ground and storms out. Lorelei wonders if she has made a mistake, but Loki assures her that she will succeed where her older sister, Amora the Enchantress, has failed.

For the Love of Thor
Loki agrees to take Lorelei to Manhattan to win Thor's love; in exchange Lorelei agrees to travel to a dangerous district in New York City to hypnotize the dragon Fafnir into attacking Thor. Fafnir instead hypnotizes Lorelei, and places her in a trap near the workplace of Thor's alter-ego, Sigurd Jarlson. Thor, as Jarlson, finds and rescues the unconscious Lorelei, and fights Fafnir until the dragon flees. Believing her to be mortal, Thor calls for an ambulance; before she is taken away, Lorelei lets Thor know she is attracted to him and promises to thank him properly when she has recovered. As the ambulance drives off, he realizes he does not know her name.

Lorelei hears that Fafnir, bent on revenge, is rampaging around New York destroying buildings. Thor arrives, battles and kills Fafnir, and returns home to Jarlson's apartment. Using the name 'Melodi', Lorelei visits Jarlson to thank him for saving her life. She offers him a back rub, and gives him some of her golden mead, a love potion which will cause him to fall in love with the first person he sees. He falls asleep and Lorelei exits the apartment, leaving a note offering to cook dinner for him next weekend.

Melodi and Jarlson go on several dates; none of them end in Jarlson drinking her mead. At her apartment, she is changing into something comfortable when Jarlson takes a phone call and suddenly has to leave, turning into Thor in a nearby alley. Melodi answers a knock on the door and is kidnapped by Malekith the Accursed, ruler of the Dark Elves of Svartalfheim. He leaves a duplicate Melodi in her place. When Thor visits "Melodi", he drinks the mead and falls madly in love with her. Malekith reveals his deception and demands that Thor bring him the Casket of Ancient Winters in exchange for Melodi's return. Thor and his mortal friend Roger Willis storm Malekith's gates to rescue Melodi, but are defeated by Malekith and Algrim.  Malekith takes the casket and Thor is tossed out of the realm. Malekith presents Lorelei to his ally Wormwood and tells him to do with her what he wishes. Thor returns with Willis, defeats Malekith, rescues Lorelei, and then kisses her passionately. Malekith has managed to open the Casket, so with winter raging around them, Thor, Lorelei, and Willis return to Earth. Willis wonders how Melodi recognized Jarlson as Thor; Lorelei kisses Willis, casting a spell on him to stop him from questioning her. She gives Thor more of the mead to drink, but Willis has replaced it with an alternate drink. Meanwhile, in Asgard, Odin notices Lorelei's deception but chooses to ignore it.

While Midgard and Asgard battle against Surtur and the Sons of Muspel, Enchantress (aka Amora) appears in Lorelei's apartment, suggesting that they put aside their differences to help Asgard. Suspecting a trap, Lorelei refuses; Amora vows revenge and disappears. The battle ends; Surtur and Odin disappear.  Loki returns Lorelei to Asgard to help comfort Thor, hoping that this will help in Loki's bid to become Asgard's new ruler. Loki has Lorelei drink the elixir of Lofn; when Thor inhales it, he falls so deeply in love with her that he does whatever she says. Lorelei was tiring of Thor, but agreed to Loki's scheme only to help Thor become monarch so he would make her his queen. Amora appears and, as revenge, casts a love spell on Odin's scepter, so that when Loki picks it up and Lorelei sees him she will fall madly in love with him. Amora believes that loving the heartless Loki would eventually destroy Lorelei emotionally.

Heimdall sees that Thor is under Lorelei's control, and to save him he has Amora urge Thor to visit Loki when she knows that Loki and Lorelei are in bed together. Thor flies into a rage, temporarily overcoming the spell. Thor hurls Mjolnir into the sky, and grabs Loki by the throat. Loki releases Thor from his spell; Thor, no longer in love, pushes Lorelei aside and leaves, leaving her to fawn over Loki. Loki, bored, yells at Lorelei to fetch him a drink. Hurt, she goes to get him a drink and is stopped by Malekith. He offers her a "love potion" to add to Loki's drink. Instead, the potion knocks both Loki and Lorelei unconscious.

Amora tries to educate her sister on love and not to waste it after Daillus storms her castle to see if Lorelei is really as beautiful as everyone says and she turns him to stone.

Trip to Hel
As Seth and his army close in on Asgard, Lorelei stands with Amora while her loyalty to Asgard is questioned. Hearing that Heimdall has been injured, Amora rushes off in a fury. A distressed Lorelei joins the battle and leaps in the way of projectiles meant for Balder. After Thor and Asgard are triumphant, Amora cradles her dying sister in her arms. Hela takes Lorelei's soul and possesses it in the Destroyer.

Sif and Balder travel to Hel, searching for Thor's spirit. The Destroyer (which, unknown to Sif and Balder, is occupied by Lorelei's soul) stops them, declares that it has overthrown Hela, and attacks them for having mortal forms. Sif and Balder escape by using a Norn Stone to become invisible. They meet Garm and learn that Hela had freed the Destroyer from its crystal prison but a spirit possessed the armor and imprisoned Hela and Garm. Balder and Sif seek a mystic sword which can free Hela from her crystal prison but the sword is holding Gar-Toom prisoner. They retrieve the sword, but then are trapped between Gar-Toom and the Destroyer. The Destroyer destroys Gar-Toom while Balder frees Hela, and the pair learn that it is Lorelei who inhabits the Destroyer. She prepares to unleash its ultimate power of disintegration, but is delayed when she accidentally collapses a wall on to herself, and Sif and Balder escape.

Hela decides to allow Lorelei's spirit to go free, and Lorelei spends months in Hel battling the Great Beasts while awaiting future torture. She meets Malekith, who aids in her plot to return to life and regain the love of Thor. She sends her vision to Thing, who retrieves the love potion from her apartment; however, Malekith uses his magic to mimic Lorelei and tells Thing to drink the elixir; he falls in love with Lorelei. Malekith then instructs Thing to battle Thor and Sif, but Thing is unable to kill Sif because it is not in his nature. From Hel, Malekith then calls forth his old ally, Kurse. In Asgard, Kurse dives down to Hel, calling for Malekith. He defeats Hela and becomes the new master of Hel. Malekith, still disguised as Lorelei, tricks Kurse into helping him escape to Earth. Kurse sees Thor; believing him to be Malekith, he calls forth dead monsters from Hel and Nifleheim to attack him.

Journey into Mystery
While Amora and the other the Asgardian gods work to recover their true identities, Seth restores Lorelei to life. Amora is happy to see her sister return to life, but Seth urges her to kill Amora in order to step out of her sister's shadow. While restrained by her sister and the other gods, Lorelei knocks everyone unconscious with a concussive spell. Lorelei takes Amora into an adjacent realm to terrorize her, but Amora refuses to fight back. Lorelei reveals that Seth has created her from a mere shadow without any emotion or conscience. Amora begs Lorelei's forgiveness for not being a very good older sister, and releases her from Seth's spell, destroying her body.

Defenders
In Asgard, Pluto, Lord of Hades, promises Lorelei earthly power and dominion if she wields a spell to create a Valkyrie for him. Lorelei agrees to do so, to prove that she is better than her sister. She bonds a mortal, Samantha Parrington, to become a Valkyrie subject to Pluto and Lorelei's commands. Pluto manipulates the magic and transforms Lorelei into a Valkyrie as well, and sends her to Earth with little memory and unable to speak. Valkyrie travels with Nighthawk and Hellcat to Canada where Lorelei and Samantha as the Valkyries fight each other while the Defenders, Hulk, Doctor Strange, Namor, Silver Surfer, Nighthawk, Hellcat, with equal powers, fight Pluto's minions. Lorelei is able to break Pluto's spell; she returns to her natural form and immediately attacks Pluto. The two fight to gain control over the Valkyrie while the Defenders destroy Pluto's temple, allowing his denizens of the dead to pour through to Earth. As the Defenders fight the dead, the Asgardian Valkyrior come to their aid.  Pluto and Lorelei continue their fight for control of Valkyrie, who soon break the spell and lash out against them. A vision of Zeus appears above them, promising punishment. Pluto and Lorelei teleport away rather than face Zeus' wrath.

Loki: Agent of Asgard
Lorelei returns in the 2014 series Loki: Agent of Asgard #2.

Powers and abilities
Like all Asgardians, Lorelei is long-lived, aging at an extremely slow rate upon reaching adulthood. Asgardian flesh and bone is about three times denser than similar human tissue, contributing to her superhuman strength, durability and endurance. She is also immune to all Earth diseases and resistant to conventional injury.

Lorelei may have the potential for mystical powers like her sister, Amora, but she chosen not to develop it to the same extent. In battle against Seth and his minions, she was depicted as firing mystical force bolts, similar to her sister's. After being resurrected by Seth, her magical powers were greatly enhanced, even beyond those of her sister and she retained these heightened abilities in later years, with her power being equal to that of Pluto.

Lorelei's great beauty and seductive manner enable her to persuade virtually any male god or mortal to do whatever she wants. Lorelei has some knowledge of sorcery, mostly pertaining to love charms and potions. Lorelei also possesses a petrifying kiss, transforming victims into a granite statue.

Other versions

Loki Triumphant
After Loki defeats Thor, reduces all the gods to their knees, and becomes the new master of Asgard, Lorelei returns to the castle and wants payment for helping him achieve his newfound status. She is accompanied by many shadowy figures demanding their due for their part in making Loki master, but Loki grows bored listening to their demands and leaves.

Spider-Ham
In Spider-Ham's universe, Lorelei appears as villain Loreli Lemur. She hypnotizes the owners of some neighborhood pets only to have Spider-Ham battle and eventually defeat her.

In other media

Television
 Lorelei appears in "The Mighty Thor" segment of The Marvel Super Heroes, voiced by Peg Dixon.
 Lorelei appears in Agents of S.H.I.E.L.D., played by Elena Satine. She first makes a cameo appearance in the episode "T.A.H.I.T.I." where she arrives in Death Valley. In the episode "Yes Men", Lorelei is revealed to have been a prisoner in Asgard before she was released during the attack of the Dark Elves in the events of Thor: The Dark World. She arrived on Earth to recruit an army where Sif, with the aid of the S.H.I.E.L.D. agents, was able to defeat Lorelei and bring her back to Asgard to be re-incarcerated.

Video games
Lorelei appears as a playable character in Lego Marvel Avengers.

References

External links
 Lorelei at Marvel.com

Characters created by Walt Simonson
Comics characters introduced in 1984
Fictional characters with energy-manipulation abilities
Fictional characters with slowed ageing
Fictional characters with superhuman durability or invulnerability
Marvel Comics Asgardians
Marvel Comics characters who can move at superhuman speeds
Marvel Comics characters who use magic
Marvel Comics characters with accelerated healing
Marvel Comics characters with superhuman strength
Marvel Comics female supervillains